Clas or CLAS may refer to:

 Clas (given name)
 Clas (ecclesiastical settlement), a medieval church in Wales
 CLAS (education), a standards-based assessment used in California
 CLAS detector, the CEBAF Large Acceptance Spectrometer at the Thomas Jefferson National Accelerator Facility
 CESG Listed Advisor Scheme, a system of IT Security specialists working on government computer systems in the UK
 University of Florida College of Liberal Arts and Sciences
 University of Iowa College of Liberal Arts and Sciences
 Center for Latin American Studies - University of Pittsburgh
 Community Legal Assistance Society, a legal aid office in Vancouver, British Columbia. 
 Conjugated linoleic acids